Operation Wedding is a documentary film about the Dymshits–Kuznetsov hijacking affair, an escape attempt from the Soviet Union by a group of young Soviet, mostly Jewish, who were denied exit visas. The documentary is told from a personal point of view of the filmmaker, Anat Zalmanson-Kuznetsov, daughter of group members: Eduard Kuznetsov and Sylva Zalmanson.

 Produced by: Sasha Klein Productions (Israel), Ego Media Latvia, Saxsonia Entertainment
 With the support of IBA (Israel Broadcasting Authority) and National Film Centre of Latvia
 Produced with the endorsement of CoPro, IDFA and EBU
 58/62 minutes, color and B&W
 Languages: English, Russian, Hebrew
 Subtitles: English. Hebrew, Russian, Latvian, Spanish
 Countries of Origins: Israel, Latvia
 Countries of filming: Israel, Latvia, Russia, England, US

Releases
 Hebrew version release: 
Israel, August 2016 Israel Broadcasting Authority 
 English version release: 
Russia, US, UK - December 2016
Latvia LTV1 - October 2017
Denmark February 2018 Danish Film Institute (documentary of the Month)
Estonia March 2018 ETV2
 Russian dubbing broadcast: Current Time TV September 2017

Awards

1. Documentary of the month – Danish Film Institute / Copenhagen, Denmark, February 2018

2. Best Documentary, Audience Choice – Chicago Festival of Israeli Cinema / Chicago, US 2017

3. Best Feature Documentary – International Filmmaker Festival of NY / New York, NY, US 2018

4. Best Writing – History Film Festival / Croatia 2018

5. Young Jury award for Best Documentary  - The Rasnov Histories and Film Festival / Romania 2018

6. Important Documentary About a Socially Relevant Topic, Semi-Final - "Award This" Film Threat / Los Angeles, US 2019

7. Opening film - Jewish Film & Culture Festival / Saarbrücken, Germany 2018

8. Semi-Finalist  - Courage Film Festival / Berlin, Germany 2019

9. Award of Excellence - Cinema World Fest Awards Winter / Ottawa, Canada 2018

10. Best Feature Film - Ogeechee International History Film Festival /  Georgia, US 2018

11. Best Documentary - Mindie, Miami Independent Film Festival / Florida, US 2018

12. Semi Final – Hollywood Screenings Film Festival / California, US 2018

13. Silver award - World Human Rights Awards / Indonesia 2018

14. Jury Award for February Best Documentary - Eurasia International Film Festival / Moscow, Russia 2018

15. Semi Final – Tribute Film Festival / Texas, US 2018

16. Semi Final – Gold Movie Awards / London, UK 2018

17. Audience Choice Award - Tirana International Documentary Film Festival /  Tirana, Albania 2017

18. Globe Award - Around Film Festival / Berlin, Germany 2017

19. Merit Award - International Film Festival Spirituality Religion and Visionary / Bali Indonesia 2017

20. Opening film - Israel Film Days / Riga, Latvia 2017

21. Award of Recognition - Hollywood International Independent Documentary Awards / California, US 2016

Reviews and articles
 Film Review at Film Threat
 BBC Jewish Hijack Plot That Changed The Soviet Union 
New Doc Details 1970 Refusenik-led Escape Attempt to Israel
‘Do You Know Your Parents Are Heroes?’ The Story Behind ‘Operation Wedding’
FILMMAKER DOCUMENTS PARENTS’ ATTEMPT TO ESCAPE USSR
Israeli filmmaker chronicles parents’ failed attempt to hijack a Soviet plane
 Film Festival Offers Documentaries and Features That Explore Many Different Sides of Israel
 The refusenik plot to fly to freedom
 ‘Operation Wedding’ and the plight of Soviet Jews

References

External links
 
 

2016 films
Hebrew-language films
2010s Russian-language films
Soviet Jews
Israeli documentary films
Latvian documentary films
2010s English-language films